Adiban Institute of Higher Education is a private institute of higher education located in Garmsar, Iran. This institute follows coeducational system and put high priority on hands-on education.

The university was established in 2006. It offers undergraduate and graduate degrees in Engineering (Electrical Engineering, Computer Engineering, and Mechanical Engineering) and Mathematics.

See also

Higher Education in Iran
Science and technology in Iran

External links
 Official website

Universities in Iran
Educational institutions established in 2006
Education in Semnan Province
Buildings and structures in Semnan Province
2006 establishments in Iran